Roberto Caminero (27 April 1945 – August 2010) was a Cuban boxer. He competed at the 1964 Summer Olympics and the 1968 Summer Olympics.

References

1945 births
2010 deaths
Cuban male boxers
Olympic boxers of Cuba
Boxers at the 1964 Summer Olympics
Boxers at the 1968 Summer Olympics
Boxers at the 1963 Pan American Games
Pan American Games gold medalists for Cuba
Pan American Games medalists in boxing
Boxers from Havana
Lightweight boxers
Medalists at the 1963 Pan American Games
20th-century Cuban people